Viscosity is a material property which describes the resistance of a fluid to shearing flows. It
corresponds roughly to the intuitive notion of a fluid's 'thickness'. For instance, honey has
a much higher viscosity than water. Viscosity is measured using a viscometer. Measured values span several orders
of magnitude. Of all fluids, gases have the lowest viscosities, and thick liquids have the highest.

The values listed in this article are representative estimates only, as they do not account for measurement uncertainties, variability in material definitions, or non-Newtonian behavior.

Viscosities at or near standard conditions

Here "standard conditions" refers to temperatures of 25 °C and pressures of 1 atmosphere. Where data points are unavailable for 25 °C or 1 atmosphere, values are given at a nearby temperature/pressure.

The temperatures corresponding to each data point are stated explicitly. By contrast, pressure is omitted since gaseous viscosity depends only weakly on it.

Gases

Noble gases 
The simple structure of noble gas molecules makes them amenable to accurate theoretical treatment. For this reason, measured viscosities of the noble gases serve as important tests of the kinetic-molecular theory of transport processes in gases (see Chapman–Enskog theory). One of the key predictions of the theory is the following relationship between viscosity , thermal conductivity , and specific heat :

This prediction is reasonably well-verified by experiments, as the following table shows. Indeed, the relation provides a viable means for obtaining thermal conductivities of gases since these are more difficult to measure directly than viscosity.

Diatomic elements

Hydrocarbons

Organohalides

Other gases

Liquids

n-Alkanes 
Substances composed of longer molecules tend to have larger viscosities due to the increased contact of molecules across layers of flow. This effect can be observed for the n-alkanes and 1-chloroalkanes tabulated below. More dramatically, a long-chain hydrocarbon like squalene (C30H62) has a viscosity an order of magnitude larger than the shorter n-alkanes (roughly 31 mPa·s at 25 °C). This is also the reason oils tend to be highly viscous, since they are usually composed of long-chain hydrocarbons.

1-Chloroalkanes

Other halocarbons

Alkenes

Other liquids

Aqueous solutions
The viscosity of an aqueous solution can either increase or decrease with concentration depending on the solute and the range of concentration. For instance, the table below shows that viscosity increases monotonically with concentration for sodium chloride and calcium chloride, but decreases for potassium iodide and cesium chloride (the latter up to 30% mass percentage, after which viscosity increases).

The increase in viscosity for sucrose solutions is particularly dramatic, and explains in part the common experience of sugar water being "sticky".

Substances of variable composition

Viscosities under nonstandard conditions

Gases

All values are given at 1 bar (approximately equal to atmospheric pressure).

Liquids (including liquid metals)

In the following table, the temperature is given in kelvins.

Solids

References 

 
Viscosity